René François Xavier Prinet (31 December 1861, Vitry-le-François – 26 January 1946, Bourbonne-les-Bains) was a French painter and illustrator who drew his subjects from middle-class society.

Biography 
He was born to Henri Prinet, an Imperial Prosecutor in Vitry-le-François. A promotion led to him being posted in Paris, where they lived in a home not far from the École Nationale Supérieure des Beaux-Arts.

Around 1880, he began his studies in earnest, in the studios of Jean-Léon Gérôme; remaining with him until 1885. That year, his painting "The Infant Jesus" was accepted for display at the Salon. This was followed by studies at the Académie Julian. At this time, he also became associated with a group of young artists known as the Bande Noire (Black Stripe), which included Lucien Simon, André Dauchez, Émile-René Ménard and Charles Cottet. Later, he was named a Professor at the École Nationale, where he created and directed their first workshop for female artists.

In 1891, he received a commission from the government to create decorations in the Palais de la Légion d'Honneur and he submitted a design for "The Four Seasons", which was approved. That same year, he began exhibiting at the Durand-Ruel gallery. One of his best known works, The Kreutzer Sonata (inspired by the story by Tolstoy), was shown in Stuttgart and was purchased by Luitpold, Prince Regent of Bavaria. He was named a Knight in the Legion of Honor in 1900. 

Over the course of his career, he would illustrate works by Balzac, Pierre Loti, Anatole France and Henri Bataille; among many others.

In 1913, he was appointed Secretary for the Société Nationale des Beaux-Arts and travelled to the United States; serving on the jury for an exhibition at Carnegie Mellon University, where he also presented several works. He would exhibit there again in 1920. Six years later the "Société Belfortaine des Beaux-Arts" (an adjunct of the ) was established and became one of his favorite exhibition venues. His work was also part of the painting event in the art competition at the 1932 Summer Olympics.

In 1943, he was elected to the Académie des Beaux-Arts to fill the chair made vacant by the death of Jules-Alexis Muenier in 1942. In addition to painting, he wrote two texts, Initiation à la peinture, in 1935, and Initiation au dessin.

Selected paintings

References

Further reading 
 R.X. Prinet : Belfort, Musée d'art et d'histoire, 3 juillet-14 septembre 1986, Vesoul, Musée Georges Garret, 26 septembre-date-23 novembre 1986, Paris, Musée Bourdelle, 10 décembre 1986-1 février 1987, Belfort : Musée d'art et d'histoire, 1986.
Catherine Gendre, Prinet, Peintre du temps retrouvé, Somogy éditions, 2018

External links 

More works by Prinet @ ArtNet

1861 births
1946 deaths
19th-century French painters
French genre painters
Recipients of the Legion of Honour
Académie Julian
French illustrators
People from Vitry-le-François
Olympic competitors in art competitions
20th-century French painters